Pillomena is a genus of small air-breathing land snails, terrestrial pulmonate gastropod mollusks in the family  Charopidae.

Species
Species within the genus Pillomena include:
 Pillomena aemula

References

 
Charopidae
Taxonomy articles created by Polbot